Caiquetio may refer to:
 Caiquetio people, an ethnic group of Venezuela
 Caiquetio language, the extinct language formerly spoken by them
 SV Caiquetio, a football club of Aruba

Language and nationality disambiguation pages